Scincella tsinlingensis is a species of skink found in China.

References

Scincella
Reptiles of Vietnam
Reptiles described in 1966